Pomona is a small village on the Choele Choel Island in the Avellaneda Department in the Río Negro Province, in Argentina. It was already a crossing point for the Negro River to the island in 1890, when it was known as Paso Peñalva, on the way to Choele Choel. It was formally founded in 1933 and named after the goddess Pomona, because of its gardens.

Provincial Primary School #7 is located there, containing an agrotechnic school and a municipal library. In the Pomona area, there are farms that cultivate mainly pears and apples, but also peaches and trees for wood. Its closest city is Lamarque, to which is connected by the National Route 250.

References
Localidades del Valle Medio:Pomona 
"De Paso Peñalva" - Diario Río Negro 
 Census data 2013 Diario Río Negro  

Populated places in Río Negro Province
Populated places established in 1933